Samuel Noah Kramer (September 28, 1897 – November 26, 1990) was one of the world's leading Assyriologists, an expert in Sumerian history and Sumerian language. After high school, he attended Temple University, before Dropsie and Penn, both in Philadelphia. Among scholars, his work is considered transformative for the field of Sumerian history. His popular book History Begins at Sumer made Sumerian literature accessible to the general public.

Biography
Kramer was born on September 28, 1897, in Zhashkiv near Uman in the Kiev Governorate, Russian Empire (modern day Ukraine), the son of Benjamin and Yetta Kramer. His family was Jewish. In 1905, as a result of the anti-Semitic pogroms under Czar Nicholas II of Russia, his family emigrated to Philadelphia, where his father established a Hebrew school. After graduating from South Philadelphia High School, obtaining an Academic Diploma, Kramer tried a variety of occupations, including teaching in his father's school, becoming a writer and becoming a businessman.

Concerning the time when he began to approach the age of thirty, still without a career, he later stated in his autobiography, In the World of Sumer: "Finally it came to me that I might well go back to my beginnings and try to utilize the Hebrew learning on which I had spent so much of my youth, and relate it in some way to an academic future".

He enrolled at Dropsie College for Hebrew and Cognate Learning in Philadelphia, and became passionately interested in Egyptology. He then transferred to the Oriental Studies Department of the University of Pennsylvania, working with the "brilliant young Ephraim Avigdor Speiser, who was to become one of the world's leading figures in Near Eastern Studies". Speiser was trying to decipher cuneiform tablets of the Late Bronze Age dating from about 1300 BC; it was now that Kramer began his lifelong work in understanding the cuneiform writing system.

Kramer earned his PhD in 1929, and was famous for assembling tablets recounting single stories that had become distributed among different institutions around the world. He was elected to the American Philosophical Society in 1949. in He retired from formal academic life in 1968, but remained very active throughout his post-retirement years. He was elected to the American Academy of Arts and Sciences in 1971.

In his autobiography published in 1986, he sums up his accomplishments: "First, and most important, is the role I played in the recovery, restoration, and resurrection of Sumerian literature, or at least of a representative cross section ... Through my efforts several thousand Sumerian literary tablets and fragments have been made available to cuneiformists, a basic reservoir of unadulterated data that will endure for many decades to come. Second, I endeavored ... to make available reasonably reliable translations of many of these documents to the academic community, and especially to the anthropologist, historian, and humanist. Third, I have helped to spread the name of Sumer to the world at large, and to make people aware of the crucial role the Sumerians played in the ascent of civilized man".

Kramer died of throat cancer at age 93 on November 26, 1990, in Philadelphia.

See also
Inanna
Sumerian literature
Lament for Sumer and Ur
Eridu Genesis

Selected writings
 Kramer, Samuel Noah. Sumerian Mythology: Study of Spiritual and Literary Achievement in the Third Millennium B.C. 1944, rev. 1961.
 Kramer, Samuel Noah. History Begins at Sumer: Thirty-Nine Firsts in Man's Recorded History. 1956/1e (25 firsts), 1959/2e (27 firsts) 1981/3e. University of Pennsylvania Press. .
 Kramer, Samuel Noah. The Sumerians: Their History, Culture and Character. Chicago, IL: University of Chicago Press, 1963. .
 Kramer, Samuel Noah. Cradle of civilization. 1967.   (the history, politics, religion and cultural achievements of ancient Sumer, Babylonia and Assyria)
 Kramer, Samuel Noah and Diane Wolkstein. Inanna: Queen of Heaven and Earth. New York: Harper & Row, 1983. .
 Kramer, Samuel Noah. In the World of Sumer, An Autobiography. Wayne State University Press, 1988. .

References

Notes

Bibliography

External links
 Samuel Noah Kramer Institute of Assyriology and Ancient Near Eastern Studies
 Aramco article on Samuel Kramer
 New York Times Obituary

1897 births
1990 deaths
20th-century American historians
American Assyriologists
Linguists of Sumerian
American autobiographers
American people of Russian-Jewish descent
American writers of Russian descent
Dropsie College alumni
Emigrants from the Russian Empire to the United States
Jews from the Russian Empire
Jewish American academics
Jewish American historians
Jewish orientalists
People from Zhashkiv
University of Pennsylvania faculty
Writers from Philadelphia
Translators from Sumerian
20th-century translators
20th-century American male writers
American male non-fiction writers
Corresponding Fellows of the British Academy
20th-century American Jews
South Philadelphia High School alumni
Members of the American Philosophical Society